was a Japanese actor and voice actor from Gifu Prefecture, Japan. He was represented by Tokyo Actor's Consumer's Cooperative Society.

He was most known for the roles of Kanichi Nishi (Ashita no Joe), Musashi Tomoe (Getter Robo), and Mr. Popo (Dragon Ball).

Filmography

Television animation
1970
Ashita no Joe (1970) - Kanichi "Mammoth" Nishi
Vicky the Viking (1974) - Faxe (voice)
Getter Robo (1974) - Musashi Tomoe
1980
Kaitei Daisensō: Ai no 20,000 Miles (1981) - Jim (voice)
Stop!! Hibari-kun! (1983) - Seiji (voice)
Dragon Ball (1988) - Mr. Popo (voice)
Dragon Ball Z (1989) - Mr. Popo / South Kaiō (voice)
1990
The Irresponsible Captain Tylor (1993) - Yutta Do Lonawer (voice)
Dragon Ball GT (1996) - Mr. Popo (voice)
Yawara! Special: Zutto Kimi no Koto ga... . (1996) - Saitō
Berserk (1998) - Conrad (voice)
Unknown date
Akuma-kun - Zoujin
Belle and Sebastian - Prim Berg
City Hunter - Matsui / Ogura
Lupin the Third Part II - Minister Mokeru
Nintama Rantarō - Tomomi's Papa (mistakenly credited as Daisuke Gōri)
Oishinbo - Otani
Samurai Giants - Bansaku Ozutsu
The Wonderful Adventures of Nils - Sun
Uchū Majin Daikengō - Anike
Yawara! - Saitō

Original video animation (OVA)
Robot Carnival (1987) - Daimaru (voice)
Dragon Ball Z Side Story: Plan to Eradicate the Saiyans (1993) - Mr. Popo (voice)
Unknown date
Crying Freeman - Shou-Aidou

Theatrical animation
Ôkami no monshô (1973) - Umakawa
Great Mazinger vs. Getter Robo (1975) - Musashi Tomoe
Neo Heroic Fantasia Arion (1986) - Gid
Dirty Pair: Project Eden (1986) - Bruno (voice)
Akuma-kun (1989) - Zoujin
Akuma-kun: Yōkoso Akuma Land e!! (1990) - Zoujin
Dragon Ball Z: The Return of Cooler (1992) - Mr. Popo (voice)
Dragon Ball Z: Fusion Reborn (1995) - South Kaiō (Japanese version, voice)

Video games
Super Robot Wars series (1996-2005) - Musashi Tomoe, Leslie Rashid

Dubbing
The Adventures of Buckaroo Banzai Across the 8th Dimension, John Bigbooté (Christopher Lloyd)
Das Boot, Obersteuermann Kriechbaum (Bernd Tauber)

Tokusatsu
Kikaider 01 (1973) - Pollution Catfish (ep. 30)
Himitsu Sentai Goranger (1975-1976) - Gold Mask (ep. 1), Boat Ear Mask (ep. 11), Black Hair Mask (ep. 16 - 17), Wire Mask (ep. 22), Pirates Mask (ep. 38)
Roboto Hatyan (1981-1982) - Robot Yakisora
Taiyou Sentai Sun Vulcan (1981-1982) - Crab Monger　(ep. 33), Mechanic Monger　(ep. 43), Boxer Monger　(ep. 45), Fighter Monger　(ep. 48)
Dai Sentai Goggle-V (1982-1983) - Bird Mozoo (ep. 2), Mantis Mozoo (ep. 5), Cat Mozoo (ep. 7), Moth Mozoo (ep. 8), Angler Mozoo (ep. 14), Coelacanth Mozoo (ep. 21), Peacock Mozoo (ep. 22), Chameleon Mozoo (ep. 24), Watermelon Mozoo (ep. 27), Tengu Mozoo (ep. 30), Rattlesnake Mozoo (ep. 31), Tiger Mozoo (ep. 33), Crocodile Mozoo (ep. 34), Rhinoceros Mozoo (ep. 38), Reporter (actor) (ep. 41), Silkworm Mozoo (ep. 41), Tanuki Mozoo (ep. 45), Giant Tortoise Mozoo (ep. 47), Bear Mozoo (ep. 49)
Space Sheriff Gavan (1982-1983) - Ookamado Monster, Samurai Ant Monster, Armadillo Monster, Double Man Zombie C, Saber Doubler, Gas Doubler, Saimin Doubler, Guts Doubler, Hell Doubler
Kagaku Sentai Dynaman (1983-1984) - Crab Evo (ep. 1), Bat Evo (ep. 3), Sponge Evo (ep. 7), Butterfly Evo (ep. 8), Octopus Shinka (ep. 10), Gecko Evo (ep. 15), Dinosaur Evo (ep. 17), Crocodile Evo (ep. 21), Cram School Owner (actor) (ep. 22), Striped Mosquito Evo (ep. 28), Electric Eel (ep. 37), Armor Rose (ep. 38), Drill Horse (ep. 41)/Drill Pegasus (ep. 41), Rocket Tiger (ep. 43), Jet Flying Squirrel (ep. 46)
Space Sheriff Sharivan (1983-1984) - Boxer Beast, Illusion Beast, Virus Beast, Campus Beast, Kodai Beast, Great Gamagon, Hyadune Beast, Bunri Beast (voice of Eisuke Yoda), Ashura Beast (voice)
Space Sheriff Shaider (1984-1985) - Petpet, Gokugoku, Kerokero, Guriguri, Girigiri, Magmag, Shigishigi, Lovelove, Kamikami, Fumafuma, Marimari, Comcom, Moviemovie, Pairpair, Tsutatsuta
Seiun Kamen Machineman (1984) - Tetsujin Monsu
Kyojuu Tokusou Jaspion (1985) - Mega Beast Marigos (ep. 1), Gaude  (ep. 1)
Dengeki Sentai Changeman (1986-1987) - Gome (ep. 2), Rogan (ep. 15), Kigan (ep. 24), Dolon (ep. 38)
Jikuu Senshi Spielban (1986) - Puncher
Choujinki Metalder (1987) - Gaisei Coolgin, Gamadon
Choujuu Sentai Liveman (1987-1988) - Poison gas Zuno (ep. 13), Pig Zuno (ep. 24)
Kamen Rider Black (1987-1888) - Rhinoceros Mutant, Mammoth Mutant, Ammonite Mutant, Mushroom Mutant, Fly Mutant
Kamen Rider Black RX (1988-1989) - Strange Demon Robot Gungadin, Strange Alien Lifeforms Dogmalogma, Strange Demon Robot Nexticker, Strange Alien Lifeforms Matbot, Strange Alien Lifeforms Balunbolun
Kousoku Sentai Turboranger (1989-1990) - Dango Bōma, Oni Boma, Ironing Boma, Shinigami Boma
Kidou Keiji Jiban (1989) - Molenoid, Skunknoid, Dragonnoid, Electric Fishnoid, Cobranoid
Chikyu Sentai Fiveman (1990-1991) - Todorugin, Galaxy Monster Kaijurugin, Sazaemajirogin,
Choujin Sentai Jetman (1991-1992) - Voice Jigen, Ant Bazooka, Laser Lizard
Kyōryū Sentai Zyuranger (1992-1993) - Dora Circe, Dora Boogaranan, Dora Gunrock 
Gosei Sentai Dairanger (1993) - Master Mirror
Ninja Sentai Kakuranger (1994) - TV announcer (actor)
Blue Swat (1994) - Riga
Chouriki Sentai Ohranger (1995) - Bara Vacuum
Juukou B-Fighter (1995) - Bububu

References

External links
 

Japanese male voice actors
Male voice actors from Gifu Prefecture
1939 births
2005 deaths
20th-century Japanese male actors
21st-century Japanese male actors
Tokyo Actor's Consumer's Cooperative Society voice actors